Gustavo Silva Conceição,  simply known as Gustavo (born February 20, 1986) or Gustavo Geladeira (Gustavo Fridge), is a Brazilian centre back who currently plays for Londrina.

Career

Gustavo Geladeira began his career with Tigres do Brasil and made his first team debut with the club during the 2009 Campeonato Carioca. While with Tigres Gustavo went on two loan spells with Duque de Caxias and also played for Ipatinga. In 2010, he joined Boavista and his play during the 2011 Campeonato Carioca attracted the interest of Brazilian Série A club Flamengo, the club Gustavo had supported as a child. On May 10, 2011 Gustavo signed with Flamengo. While with Flamengo Gustavo played in the Copa Libertadores and Copa Sudamericana. In April 2012 Gustavo was sent on loan to Atlético Goianiense and was an important player for the club appearing in 25 matches and scoring 1 goal during the 2012 Copa Sudamericana.

In 2013 Gustavo Geladeira was sent on loan to his former club Boavista and featured regularly for the side. In June 2013 he joined Ceará in the Campeonato Brasileiro Série B. The following season, he returned to Boavista for the Carioca season and helped the club win the 2014 Taça Rio scoring the winning goal in the final against Friburguense. After a successful stay with Boavista, Gustavo joined Vila Nova for the remainder of the 2014 season and made 16 league appearances and scored 1 goal for the club.

On January 5, 2015, Gustavo Geladeira signed with Major League Soccer club Orlando City SC.

On February 12, 2015 Gustavo Geladeira was waived by Orlando City SC without ever appearing in a match.

In June 2015, Gustavo Geladeira signed a new deal of 6 months with the reigning I League champion side Mohun Bagan. But after 2 weeks he was released by mohun bagan due to sudden weight loss and poor fitness level

Career statistics
(Correct )

References

External links
ogol.com.br 

1986 births
Living people
Brazilian footballers
Campeonato Brasileiro Série A players
Campeonato Brasileiro Série B players
Clube de Regatas Brasil players
Duque de Caxias Futebol Clube players
Boavista Sport Club players
CR Flamengo footballers
Atlético Clube Goianiense players
Ceará Sporting Club players
Vila Nova Futebol Clube players
Brazilian expatriate footballers
Expatriate soccer players in the United States
Londrina Esporte Clube players
Association football central defenders